Holosko Welyke was a village in Lwów Voivodeship, eastern Poland, before the Nazi German and Soviet invasions of Poland in September 1939. It is now a suburb of Lviv, Ukraine.

Holosko Welyke was a site of a fierce defence by the Polish [[Polish army order of battle in 1939|35th Infantry Division - Reserve]] (35 Dywizja Piechoty - Rezerwowa) on September 15–16, 1939, against the invading German forces.

Bibliography 
  Tadeusz Jaruga: Wojsko Polskie : krótki informator historyczny o Wojsku Polskim w latach II wojny światowej. 7, Regularne jednostki Wojska Polskiego w 1939 : organizacja, działania bojowe, uzbrojenie, metryki związków operacyjnych, dywizji i brygad. Warszawa : Wydawnictwo Ministerstwa Obrony Narodowej 1975.
  Jerzy Prochwicz, Korpus Ochrony Pogranicza w przededniu wojny, Część II. Przemiany organizacyjne i przygotowania wojenne KOP w 1939 roku, Wojskowy Przegląd Historyczny Nr 4 (150) z 1994 r., s. 3-13,
  Ryszard Dalecki: Armia „Karpaty” w wojnie obronnej 1939 r., Rzeszów 1989, wyd. II, 
 Stepan Makarczuk, “Straty ludności w Galicji Wschodniej w latach II wojny światowej (1939–1945),” in Polska–Ukraina: Trudne pytania, vol. 6 (Warsaw: Światowy Związek Żołnierzy Armii Krajowej, Związek Ukraińców w Polsce, and Karta, 2000), p.240

Lviv